The 1992 NCAA Women's Gymnastics championship involved 12 schools competing for the national championship of women's NCAA Division I gymnastics.  It was the eleventh NCAA gymnastics national championship and the defending NCAA Team Champion for 1991 was Alabama.  The Competition took place in St. Paul, Minnesota in the St. Paul Civic Center. The 1991 Championship was won by the Utah Red Rocks.

Team Results

External links
  Gym Results

NCAA Women's Gymnastics championship
NCAA Women's Gymnastics Championship